Karimabad Rural District is in Sharifabad District of Pakdasht County, Tehran province, Iran. At the National Census of 2006, its population was 7,325 in 1,780 households. There were 6,933 inhabitants in 1,828 households at the following census of 2011. At the most recent census of 2016, the population of the rural district was 7,106 in 2,008 households. The largest of its 15 villages was Karimabad, with 2,425 people.

References 

Pakdasht County

Rural Districts of Tehran Province

Populated places in Tehran Province

Populated places in Pakdasht County